Ants in the Pants is a game designed by insect-theme game designer William H. Schaper.  The game was originally produced in 1969 by Schaper's company Schaper Toys. In 1986 it was purchased by Hasbro, which still manufactures and markets the game.

The name refers to an idiomatic expression in English which asserts that nervous, fidgety people must have "ants in their pants."  The English word "antsy" (meaning nervous) also derives from this metaphor.

The fundamental pieces involved in Ants in the Pants are a free-standing pair of miniature, usually plastic, pants; and several plastic ants.  The ants are color coded - each player uses one color of ants - and designed so that pressing the tail stores elastic potential energy.  When the tail is pressed and released, the ants spring into the air.

The object of Ants in the Pants is to spring as many of your ants as possible into the pants.  

Some versions of Ants in the Pants include characters which "wear" the pants.  These (usually cardboard) cutouts depict the character, and also serve as backboards to deflect the ants into the pants. Plastic suspenders (or braces) are another common element, which serve as obstacles.

This game appeared in the South Park episode "Damien", in which Cartman receives the game as a gift instead of the toy he wanted, and throws a tantrum.

References

External links
 Ants in the Pants Retroland
 Ants in the Pants Hasbro

Board games introduced in 1969
1970s toys
Board games of physical skill
Children's board games
Milton Bradley Company games
Schaper Toys games
Tabletop games